(born 19 July 1964) is a Japanese former ski jumper. He competed at the 1988 Winter Olympics.

Career
He competed from 1986 to 1992 season. In the World Cup he finished once among the top 10, recording one victory from January 1987 in Sapporo. At the 1985 FIS Nordic World Ski Championships he finished 6th in the team event.

World Cup

Standings

Wins

References

External links

Living people
1964 births
Japanese male ski jumpers
Olympic ski jumpers of Japan
Ski jumpers at the 1988 Winter Olympics